Sand Creek Wildlife Management Area at  is an Idaho wildlife management area in Fremont County near the town of St. Anthony. The WMA was established in 1947 when the Chapman Ranch was acquired with federal funds. 

The WMA includes sand dunes and habitat for about 3,000 elk and the only desert-wintering moose herd in the world with about 400 individuals. The area also has 1,500 mule deer and many other game species.

References

Protected areas established in 1947
Protected areas of Fremont County, Idaho
Wildlife management areas of Idaho
1947 establishments in Idaho